Negazione was a hardcore punk band based in Turin, Italy during the 1980s and early 1990s.

Formed in 1983, they were one of the most important bands of the hardcore punk scene in Italy at the time. They were one of the early bands of the Italian hardcore punk scene, like Raw Power and Wretched.

The band broke up in 1992, their last show being at that year's Monsters of Rock festival.

Bass guitarist Marco Mathieu died on 24 December 2021, at the age of 57. He was in a coma since 2017 after suffering a stroke.

Band members 
The main members of the band were: 
Guido Sassola, "Zazzo" – vocals
Roberto Farano, "Tax" – guitar
Marco Mathieu (1964 – 24 December 2021) – bass guitar

In the course of the band's existence there were many changes in drummers. In chronological order they were:
Orlando Furioso
Michele D'Alessio
Roberto Vernetti – drum machine
Fabrizio Fiegl (died 18 July 2011)
Rowdy James
Stefano Bonanni, "Bone"
Elvin Betty
Giovanni Pellino, "Jeff", now known as "Neffa", funky-pop singer
Massimo Ferrusi

Discography

Studio albums
Mucchio selvaggio (1984) (split cassette with Declino)
Lo spirito continua... (1986)
Little Dreamer (1988)
100% (1990)

EPs
Tutti pazzi (1985)
Condannati a morte nel vostro quieto vivere (1985)
...nightmare (1987)
Behind the Door" (1989)
 Sempre in bilico (1989)

Compilation albumsWild Bunch: The Early Days (1989)TuttiPazzi: Negazione 1983-1992 (2002)Il giorno del sole (2012)La Nostra Vita (2017)

SinglesSempre in bilico'' (1989)

References

External links 
Official site
 
Live Concert Video 1988 in Zurich, Switzerland

1983 establishments in Italy
1992 disestablishments in Italy
Italian hardcore punk groups
Musical groups from Turin
Musical groups established in 1983
Musical groups disestablished in 1992